Mehram is town and union council of Kachi District in the Balochistan province of Pakistan. It is located at 28°51'0N 67°49'0E and has an altitude of 67 metres (223 feet).

References

Populated places in Kachhi District
Union councils of Balochistan, Pakistan